The 1967 Daytona 500 was a NASCAR Grand National Series event that was held on February 26, 1967, at Daytona International Speedway in Daytona Beach, Florida. 
Mario Andretti won his first NASCAR Cup Series race. And he was the first foreign born, European and Italian driver to win a NASCAR Cup Series race.

Summary
Mario Andretti, better known for his accomplishments in open-wheel and USAC competition, won his first and only NASCAR Grand National Series event, pulling away from 1965 winner Fred Lorenzen in the closing laps. He ran in a Holman-Moody Ford. This is the only time a person born outside the United States has ever won the Daytona 500.

More than 94,000 people witnessed a 204-minute race where six cautions slowed the pace for a total of 54 laps. There were 36 lead changes among 9 drivers.
Tiny Lund ran out of gas while trying to win the race. Six drivers failed to make the grid; including Don Biederman and Earl Brooks. Innes Ireland raced his final race ever when the V8 engine of his Dodge exploded outside the stands.

First Daytona 500 starts for Donnie Allison, Clyde Lynn, Ramo Stott, Gary Bettenhausen, and Coo Coo Marlin. Only Daytona 500 starts for Dorus Wisecarver, Joel Davis, Innes Ireland, Ken Spikes, Bob Pickell, and George England. Last Daytona 500 starts for H. B. Bailey, Curtis Turner, J. T. Putney, Jim Paschal, Dick Hutcherson, Don White, Blackie Watt, and Paul Lewis.

Race results

 Mario Andretti
 Fred Lorenzen
 James Hylton
 Tiny Lund
 Jerry Grant
 Darel Dieringer
 Sonny Hutchins
 Richard Petty
 Jim Hurtubise
 Neil Castles
 Donnie Allison
 John Sears
 Roy Mayne
 Dorus Wisecarver
 Wendell Scott
 Paul Goldsmith
 Henley Gray
 H.B. Bailey
 Bobby Isaac
 Elmo Langley
 Clyde Lynn
 Sam McQuagg
 Ramo Stott
 David Pearson
 Curtis Turner
 Joel Davis
 Innes Ireland
 Buddy Baker
 J.T. Putney
 Gordon Johncock
 Gary Bettenhausen
 Jim Paschal
 Charlie Glotzbach
 LeeRoy Yarbrough
 Ken Spikes
 Dick Hutcherson
 A. J. Foyt
 Don White
 Cale Yarborough
 Bobby Allison
 Bob Pickell
 Red Farmer
 Bobby Johns
 G.C. Spencer
 Blackie Watt
 Paul Lewis
 Frank Warren
 Friday Hassler
 George England
 Coo Coo Marlin

References

Daytona 500
Daytona 500
NASCAR races at Daytona International Speedway
Dayton 500